William Andrew Quirk (March 27, 1873April 20, 1926) was an American stage and silent-film actor. He performed in more than 180 films between 1909 and 1924. Born in Jersey City, New Jersey, he died in Los Angeles, California. Gem Motion Picture Company produced a series of "Billy"-titled pictures starring Quirk.

Partial filmography 

A Sound Sleeper (1909, Short) - uncredited 
The Hessian Renegades (1909, Short) - Hessian
Pippa Passes (1909, Short) - In Studio
Nursing a Viper (1909, Short) - Fleeing Aristocrat
The Red Man's View (1909, Short) - Conqueror (uncredited)
In Little Italy (1909, Short) - At the Ball
To Save Her Soul (1909, Short)
Choosing a Husband (1909, Short) - 2nd Bachelor
The Woman from Mellon's (1910, Short) - Harry Townsend
The Two Brothers (1910, Short) - Mexican
The Lucky Toothache (1910, Short)
How Rastus Gets His Turkey (1910, Short) - Rastus
Algie the Miner (1912, Short) - Algie Allmore
Billy Gets Arrested (1913, Short) - Billy
Burglarizing Billy (1913, Short) - Billy
Billy's First Quarrel (1913, Short) - Billy
Billy's Adventure (1913, Short) - Billy
Billy in Armor (1913, Short) - Billy
What Happened to Father? (1915) - Dawson Hale
Intolerance (1916) - Bartender
The Matinee Idol (1916, Short)
The Web of Life (1917) - The Valet
His Day Out (1918, Short)
The Man Worth While (1921) - Napoleon
At the Stage Door (1921) - Harold Reade
My Old Kentucky Home (1922) - Loney Smith
Success (1923) - Nick Walker
The Glimpses of the Moon (1923) - Bob Fulmer
Salomy Jane (1923) - Colonel Starbottle
Broadway Broke (1923) - Joe Karger
A Bride for a Knight (1923)
The Dixie Handicap (1924) - A Tout

Notes

References

External links 

 

1873 births
1926 deaths
Silent film comedians
Male actors from Jersey City, New Jersey
American male silent film actors
20th-century American male actors
American male comedy actors